The following is a list of events that occurred in 2015 in Mali.

Events

January
 January 4 – A vehicle carrying United Nations peacekeepers hits a roadside bomb in northern Mali injuring six soldiers.

March
 March 7 – A suspected terrorist attack in Bamako kills five people.
 March 8 – A rocket and shelling attack in Kidal, northern Mali kills three people, including a UN peacekeeper.

August
 August 7 – Gunmen storm the Hotel Byblos in Sévaré and take hostages. Three hostages were killed as well as five soldiers and the four suspected Islamist militants. according to government spokesman Choguel Kokala Maiga.

References

 
2010s in Mali
Mali
Mali
Years of the 21st century in Mali